Roy Travers (born 1883 in London) was a British actor. Travers appeared in a number of films (mostly directed by Kenelm Foss) made by Astra Films. He died in 1941.

Selected filmography
 East Lynne (1913)
 Sixty Years a Queen (1913)
 Lights of London (1914)
 Tommy Atkins (1915)
 The Rogues of London (1915)
 The Lure of Drink (1915)
 The Man Who Bought London (1916)
 Diana and Destiny (1916)
 It Is for England (1916)
 Auld Lang Syne (1917)
 Little Women (1917)
 The Splendid Coward (1918)
 Ave Maria (1918)
 The Lackey and the Lady (1919)
 No. 5 John Street (1921)
 Cherry Ripe (1921)
 The Street of Adventure (1921)
 All Roads Lead to Calvary (1921)
 The Double Event (1921)
 A Romance of Old Baghdad (1922)
 The House of Peril (1922)
 The Hypocrites (1923)
 The Indian Love Lyrics (1923)
 Moonbeam Magic (1924)
 For Valour (1928)
 Q Ships (1928)
 Down Channel (1929)
 Romany Love (1931)
 Kiss Me Sergeant (1932)

References

External links

1883 births
Year of death unknown
English male film actors
English male silent film actors
Male actors from London
20th-century English male actors